William Rede may refer to:
William Reade (bishop) or Rede, medieval bishop of Chichester
William Rede (by 1529–at least 1569), MP for Devizes
William Rede (died 1558), MP for Cricklade, and for Gloucestershire
William Leman Rede (1802–1847), playwright

See also
William Reade (disambiguation)
William Read (disambiguation)
William Reid (disambiguation)
William Reed (disambiguation)